This article lists the films composed by Ilaiyaraaja in the 2020's.

Ilaiyaraaja 2020

Ilaiyaraaja 2021

Ilaiyaraaja 2022

Decade-wise Statistics

References

External links
 
 Raaja.com: The official Internet website of Ilaiyaraaja
 Collection of Ilayaraja songs at Paadal.com
 Collection of Ilayaraja Songs, Videos, Images and BGM

Indian songs
Discographies
Discographies of Indian artists